Carrietta Nadine White is the title character and protagonist of American author Stephen King's first published 1974 horror novel, Carrie.

In every adaptation and portrayal of Carrie, she is portrayed as a high school outcast, bullied, slandered and abused by students and even her own mother Margaret, an unstable religious fanatic. She also has telekinetic powers that confuse and frighten her, and fuel Margaret's conviction that her daughter is possessed by the Devil.

Novel

Carrie White is blonde-haired with brown eyes, slightly overweight, shy, lonely, and isolated. She is severely bullied at school. Her widowed mother, Margaret, is a mentally unstable religious fanatic who beats her daughter and throws her into a "prayer closet" whenever she does something that her mother thinks is sinful. 

When Carrie gets her first period on the floor in the girls' locker room, Carrie panics; she does not know what is happening as Margaret never taught her about menstruation. The terrified Carrie seeks help in the other girls, believing that she is dying. The other girls, led by the popular Chris Hargensen and her friend Sue Snell, shout 'period' over and over and stare at Carrie as she showers. The school gym teacher Rita Desjardin - who pities rather than likes Carrie - punishes the girls who were involved with a week of detention, and bans Chris from the prom when she refuses to comply. Chris schemes for revenge against Carrie with the help of her boyfriend, Billy Nolan.

Meanwhile, Carrie is thrilled when Sue's boyfriend Tommy Ross asks her to the prom, unaware that Sue had asked him to do it in order to atone for bullying her. When Margaret learns about the prom, she is furious, and forbids her to go. Finally fed up with her mother's abuse, Carrie uses her powers to knock Margaret to the floor, and proceeds to go the prom with Tommy.

At the prom, Tommy and Carrie are voted Prom King and Queen - unaware that Chris had engineered Carrie's victory as part of a plan to get revenge for being banned from the prom. As an elated Carrie accepts her crown, Chris and Billy dump a bucket of pig's blood over her head, provoking the entire school, even Desjardin, to start laughing at her. Humiliated and enraged, Carrie loses control of her powers and lets loose a torrent of telekinetic energy that demolishes the school and kills several students. As she walks home, she unleashes her powers on the town as well, destroying several buildings and killing hundreds of people.

When she returns home, she tells Margaret what happened, and Margaret tells her that she has been possessed by Satan and must be destroyed. Margaret attacks Carrie with a carving knife, and reveals that she became pregnant with her after her husband, Carrie's father, raped her. She stabs Carrie in the shoulder, but Carrie kills her by telekinetically stopping her heart.

Mortally wounded, Carrie makes her way to the roadhouse where she was conceived. She sees Chris and Billy leaving, having been informed of the destruction by one of Billy's friends. After Billy attempts to run Carrie over, she telekinetically takes control of his car and sends it racing into the tavern wall, killing both Billy and Chris. Sue finds Carrie collapsed in the parking lot, bleeding out from the knife wound. The two have a brief telepathic conversation (revealing that Sue has telepathy), in which Carrie realizes that Sue was not involved in the prank and forgives her for her past cruelty. Carrie then dies, crying out for her mother.

Performers
 Sissy Spacek (1976; theatrical film)
 Linzi Hateley (1988; musical)
 Angela Bettis (2002; television film)
 Jodelle Ferland (2002; television film )
 Molly Ranson (2012; musical)
 Chloë Grace Moretz (2013; theatrical film)
 Skyler Wexler (2013; theatrical film )
 Madelaine Petsch (2018; Riverdale: A Night to Remember )
 Emilija Baranac (2018; Riverdale: A Night to Remember )

Musical

In 1988, Carrie was adapted into a musical co-produced by the Royal Shakespeare Company. Carrie was portrayed by Linzi Hateley in both the London production and the Broadway transfer. Her songs include "And Eve Was Weak", "Evening Prayers", and "I Remember How Those Boys Could Dance" (duets with Betty Buckley, who also played teacher Miss Collins in the 1976 film, as her mother) and the solos "I'm Not Alone" and "Carrie".

Linzi Hateley won a Theatre World Award for Best Newcomer for this, her first starring role. She recorded the song "Carrie" for her album Sooner or Later.

The pig's blood scene and the ensuing massacre are depicted in the musical number "The Destruction". Carrie seals off the exits, kills everyone present (staged through pyrotechnics and lasers), and brings down the ceiling, burying the promgoers. Carrie sinks to the floor and begins to cry. Margaret arrives in an evening dress, and comforts her. She then stabs Carrie on the school stairs (a "white-on-white staircase to heaven") during the song "Carrie (reprise)" in a moment described by one scholar as "the sort of moment Florenz Ziegfeld might have come up with had a lunatic asked him to stage a Grand Guignol version of his Follies". Carrie uses her powers to stop Margaret's heart before dying herself, comforted by Sue.

2012 revival
The 2012 revival of the show portrays a different version of events. The blood is dumped onto Carrie (portrayed by Molly Ranson) from above, as in the book. She slams the doors shut and turns off the lights, creating a blackout. The lights struggle back on in a strobe effect as Carrie forces everyone else to the ground. The students writhe in desperation as Carrie sets the gym on fire, and telekinetically forces Chris Hargensen to break her own neck. Several try to escape but are pinned to the walls. Carrie then leaves, blowing up the gym as she does so. Sue narrates how Carrie cuts a trail of destruction across town on her way home, as Sue herself follows her. At the White home, Carrie finds Margaret reciting prayers. She takes Carrie in her arms and sings softly to her before revealing the kitchen knife and stabbing her. Carrie uses her powers to force the knife out of Margaret's hands before stopping her heart. Sue enters, and cradles Carrie as she dies of her wounds.

Other media
The television series Riverdale featured an episode based on the musical, "Chapter Thirty-One: A Night to Remember", with series stars Madelaine Petsch and Emilija Baranac, who played the characters Cheryl Blossom and Midge Klump as different versions of Carrie, respectively. In this story, Cheryl is a participant for the role of Carrie in the musical. However, the musical's director Kevin Keller (portrayed by Casey Cott) had offered the role to Midge, until she was killed by the Black Hood at the end of the episode.

The music video for "Hell in the Hallways" by the American metal band Ice Nine Kills is based on the story with Isabel McGinity as Carrie. However, this has not been the only music video in which Carrie has appeared, the music video for Chicago band Common Shiner's Social Mediasochist featured her as the crush of fellow horror icon Jason Voorhees, seen as her fellow student of 'Wes Craven's Slasher High School' although, at the start of the video, she is dating Michael Myers, and this love triangle becomes a focal point of the plot, however things come to a head at the school's 'Slash Dance', in a fashion that references the story, and while they're shot at the end, Carrie and Jason still survive. In the sequel, their story continues, years later they're now married, and have an infant child (the gender is unclear) however, we see that Jason is actually bored with this new domestic life, as evidenced when he upsets her at a dinner party, and the day after this, whilst working his office job at 'Reboot Co', Jason is tempted by one of his coworkers, an original character named the 'Maniac Pixie Dream Girl' however when she splatters blood on herself, she reminds Jason of Carrie and he flees, and Carrie eventually kills the Maniac Pixie Dream Girl after she kills Jason in retaliation, before resurrecting Jason as Uber-Jason

References

https://nerdreactor.com/2014/10/20/teen-rom-com-jason-freddy-carrie/

http://www.fridaythe13thfranchise.com/2018/08/low-carb-comedy-is-back-with-jason.html

External links
Official website for Carrie the Musical

Carrie (franchise)
Characters in American novels of the 20th century
Child characters in literature
Female horror film villains
Female literary villains
Fictional characters from Maine
Fictional characters who use magic
Fictional Christians
Fictional mass murderers
Fictional matricides
Fictional female murderers
Fictional offspring of rape
Fictional rampage and spree killers
Fictional telepaths
Fictional telekinetics
Fictional terrorists
Literary characters introduced in 1974
Stephen King characters
Teenage characters in film
Teenage characters in literature
Teenage characters in musical theatre
Fictional victims of domestic abuse
Female characters in film
Female characters in literature
Female characters in musical theatre